The Piscataqua River is an  tributary of the Presumpscot River in the U.S. state of Maine. Via the Presumpscot River, it is part of the watershed of Casco Bay, an arm of the Atlantic Ocean.

It rises at the outlet of Forest Lake in the southern corner of the town of Gray, flows briefly northeast, then turns southeast and enters the town of Cumberland.

Continuing southwest, it enters Falmouth, turns more south-southeast, and reaches the Presumpscot River just north of the Interstate 495 bridge.

See also
List of rivers of Maine

References
Notes

Bibliography

Maine Streamflow Data from the USGS
Maine Watershed Data From Environmental Protection Agency

Rivers of Cumberland County, Maine
Cumberland, Maine
Falmouth, Maine
Gray, Maine
Rivers of Maine
Maine placenames of Native American origin